Daniel Vaughan (27 July 1897 – 23 September 1975) was an Irish politician and farmer. He was first elected to Dáil Éireann at the 1922 general election as a Farmers' Party Teachta Dála (TD) for the Cork Mid, North, South, South East and West constituency. He was re-elected at the 1923 general election for the Cork North constituency. He was again re-elected at the June 1927, September 1927 and 1932 general elections.

After the 1932 general election, Vaughan along all other sitting Farmers' Party TDs joined the newly formed National Centre Party and they contested the 1933 general election under that banner; however Vaughan was not re-elected.

References

1897 births
1975 deaths
Farmers' Party (Ireland) TDs
National Centre Party (Ireland) TDs
Members of the 3rd Dáil
Members of the 4th Dáil
Members of the 5th Dáil
Members of the 6th Dáil
Members of the 7th Dáil
Politicians from County Cork
20th-century Irish farmers
People of the Irish Civil War (Pro-Treaty side)